Xiao Gui may refer to:

Alien Huang, Taiwanese singer
Wang Linkai, Chinese singer